Paragonite is a mineral, related to muscovite. A wide solvus separates muscovite from paragonite, such that there is little solid solution along the vector Na+K+ and apparent micas of intermediate composition is most commonly a microscopic (or even sub-microscopic) intergrowth of two distinct micas, one rich in K, and the other in Na. Paragonite is a common mineral in rocks metamorphosed under blueschist facies conditions along with other sodic minerals such as albite, jadeite and glaucophane. During the transition from blueschist to greenschist facies, paragonite and glaucophane are transformed into chlorite and albite. Jadeite bearing pyroxene minerals have suggested Clinozoisite and paragonite are associated and derived from lawsonite releasing Quartz and water via the following reaction:

4CaAl2Si2O8(H2O)2 + NaAlSi2O6 <=> 2Ca2Al3Si3O12(OH) + NaAl3Si3O10(OH)2 + SiO2 + 6H2O

It was first described in 1843 for an occurrence at Mt. Campione, Tessin, Switzerland. The name derives from the Greek, paragon, for misleading, due to its similar appearance to talc.

References

Mica group
Sodium minerals
Aluminium minerals
Monoclinic minerals
Minerals in space group 15